Zhang Cheng (died  215), courtesy name Gongxian, was an official serving under the warlord Cao Cao during the late Eastern Han dynasty of China.

Life
Zhang Cheng was born in the Eastern Han dynasty in Xiuwu County, Henei Commandery, which is present-day Huojia County, Henan. His grandfather, Zhang Xin, served as Minister over the Masses in the Han imperial court, while his father, Zhang Yan, served as Grand Commandant. He had an elder brother, Zhang Fan, who was as equally well known as him. Unlike Zhang Fan, who turned down invitations to serve in the Han government, Zhang Cheng accepted an offer to become a government official after he was nominated on grounds of virtuous conduct. He started out as a Consultant and was later promoted to Commandant of Yique.

In 189, after the warlord Dong Zhuo seized control of the Han central government and held the figurehead Emperor Xian hostage, Zhang Cheng wanted to gather like-minded people to rise up against Dong Zhuo's tyranny and overthrow him. At the time, Zhang Zhao, another younger brother of Zhang Fan and Zhang Cheng, was also serving as a Consultant under the Han government. Zhang Zhao came from Chang'an to meet Zhang Cheng and tell him, "We can't defeat Dong Zhuo now because we aren't as powerful as him. Besides, it'll take time for us to set your plan into motion. We'll need to draft civilians into military service, train them to be soldiers, gain support from the political elites, and so on. It's impossible to achieve all these at the moment. Dong Zhuo won't last long because he lacks legitimacy and relies solely on military power. Why don't we find someone to take shelter under, pledge allegiance to him, and wait for an opportunity to take action, and fulfil our ambitions." Zhang Cheng agreed with his brother. He then resigned from government service, returned home, gathered his family members and moved to Yang Province.

In the 190s, the warlord Yuan Shu controlled the lands around the Huai River in Yang Province. He had heard of Zhang Cheng's elder brother, Zhang Fan, and wanted to recruit him as an adviser. However, Zhang Fan claimed that he was ill and sent Zhang Cheng to meet Yuan Shu instead. Yuan Shu asked Zhang Cheng, "In the past, when the kings of the Zhou dynasty were weak, warlords such as Duke Huan of Qi and Duke Wen of Jin rose up and became the dominant powers; when the Qin dynasty was collapsing, the Han dynasty rose up and replaced it. Now, as I rule over many territories and its people, I hope to enjoy the same glory as Duke Huan of Qi and Duke Wen of Jin did, and follow in the footsteps of Emperor Gaozu of Han. What do you think?" Zhang Cheng replied, "It depends on virtue rather than power. If a man can embody everyone's hopes for a benevolent and virtuous ruler, even if he has nothing to his name, it won't be hard for him to achieve what you described. However, if a man doesn't know his place and decides to do something against the people's will, everyone will abandon him instead of helping him." Yuan Shu was displeased by what Zhang Cheng said.

When the warlord Cao Cao, who controlled the Han central government and the figurehead Emperor Xian from 196 onwards, wanted to launch a military campaign in Ji Province, Yuan Shu summoned Zhang Cheng and asked him, "Lord Cao, with his few thousand weary and tired soldiers, wants to fight an army of 100,000. He doesn't know where he stands! What do you think?" Zhang Cheng replied, "The Han Empire may have declined in virtue, but its legitimacy still stands. Now, as Lord Cao has the Emperor on his side, he will still be able to prevail against an enemy with a 100,000 strong army." Yuan Shu was extremely unhappy but did not say anything. Zhang Cheng then left.

Around 207, after Cao Cao had defeated his rivals in northern China and unified the region under his control, he sent a messenger to invite Zhang Cheng's elder brother, Zhang Fan, to serve in the government. However, Zhang Fan claimed that he was ill and remained behind in Pengcheng (彭城; around present-day Xuzhou, Jiangsu). He sent Zhang Cheng to meet Cao Cao instead. Cao Cao appointed Zhang Cheng as a Counsellor Remonstrant.

On one occasion, Zhang Cheng's son Zhang Jian and nephew Zhang Ling (張陵; Zhang Fan's son) were kidnapped by bandits in Shandong. When Zhang Fan asked them to release the boys, they freed only Zhang Ling. Zhang Fan then asked them if he could trade his son for his nephew instead because his nephew was younger. The bandits were so impressed by his act of sacrifice that they released both Zhang Ling and Zhang Jian.

In 213, after Emperor Xian enfeoffed Cao Cao as the Duke of Wei, Zhang Cheng was appointed as an Army Adviser and Libationer under Cao Cao and concurrently as the Administrator of Zhao Commandery (趙郡; around present-day Neiqiu County, Hebei). He governed Zhao Commandery well during his tenure. Around 215, when Cao Cao was on a campaign in western China, he summoned Zhang Cheng to accompany him as an adviser in his army. Zhang Cheng died of illness in Chang'an along the way.

Family
Apart from Zhang Jian, Zhang Cheng probably had at least one other child. Zhang Shao, a grandson of Zhang Cheng, served as a military officer under the Jin dynasty (266–420). He was executed along with his maternal uncle, Yang Jun, in 291.

See also
 Lists of people of the Three Kingdoms

Notes

References

 Chen, Shou (3rd century). Records of the Three Kingdoms (Sanguozhi).
 
 Pei, Songzhi (5th century). Annotations to Records of the Three Kingdoms (Sanguozhi zhu).
 

Year of birth unknown
215 deaths
Han dynasty politicians from Henan
Politicians from Xinxiang
Officials under Cao Cao
Yuan Shu and associates